Aayudham is a 1990 Indian Telugu-language action film directed by K. Murali Mohan Rao starring Krishna, Ghattamaneni Ramesh Babu, Radha and Vani Viswanath in the lead roles. The film was produced by G. Satyanarayana for Sri Balaji Films.

Cast 
 Krishna as Kalyan Kumar IAS
 Ghattamaneni Ramesh Babu as Benerjee
 Radha
 Vani Viswanath
 Kaikala Satyanarayana as Peda Venkatrayudu
Mada
P. L. Narayana
Suthi Velu
Sai Kumar as China Venkatrayudu
Mallikarjuna Rao
Siva Krishna

Soundtrack 
Chakravarthy scored and composed the film's soundtrack album which comprised 5 songs. Veturi Sundrarama Murthy penned the lyrics.
 "Yeve Yeve Rangamma" — Mano, S. Janaki
 "Chinthaku Thooche" — S. P. B., S. Janaki
 "Maa Palle Kochindhi" — Mano, S. Janaki
 "Saru Doragaaru" — S. P. B., S. Janaki
 "Baava Nuvvu Naa Mogudu" — S. P. B., S. Janaki

References 

1990 films
1990s Telugu-language films
Indian action films
Films scored by K. Chakravarthy
1990 action films